Higham on the Hill is a village and civil parish in the Hinckley and Bosworth district of Leicestershire, England. The population at the 2011 census was 840.

The village's name means 'homestead/village which is high'.

Geography
The village is about three miles away from both Hinckley and Nuneaton. The parish (and the boundary between the East and West Midlands) is bounded by Warwickshire and the A5 to the south-west.

The parish includes the deserted village of Lindley that was mentioned in the Domesday Book and gave its name to RAF Lindley the site of which was acquired by the automotive research institute MIRA Ltd for its proving ground opened on 22 May 1954.

The Ashby Canal passes through the east of the parish, and the parish boundary runs along it near Stoke Golding.

The Ashby and Nuneaton Joint Railway used to pass through the parish, with its own dedicated railway station, which has since been demolished, Higham-on-the-Hill railway station.

Geographical centre of England
Lindley Hall Farm, the geographical centre of England as defined by the Ordnance Survey, lies within the parish at latitude 52°33'N, longitude 01°27'W, just north of Watling Street.

Amenities
The village is home to St Peter's Church, a Grade II* listed parish church dedicated to St Peter.

Historically, Higham on the Hill had three pubs: The Barley Sheaf Inn, which was demolished to make way for houses on the land, The Fox Inn, which has since been converted into a house, and The Oddfellows Arms, which closed down in August 2018.

There is only one retailer in the village, a local independent corner shop, Sehmbi Stores.

In the village, there is the Higham on the Hill Church of England primary school, which has received the rating of "Good" by Ofsted in their 2020 inspection.

Notable residents
Robert Burton, author of The Anatomy of Melancholy, was born in Lindley
Geoffrey Fisher, Lord Archbishop of Canterbury from 1944 to 1961, born in 1887 and lived in the rectory

References

External links

 Primary school
 Leicestershire villages
 Former Lindley Hall

Villages in Leicestershire
Civil parishes in Leicestershire
Hinckley and Bosworth